Rebecca Lynn is an American venture capitalist.  She is the co-founder and general manager of Canvas Ventures,  an early-stage investment firm based in Portola Valley, California.

Lynn grew up in a small town in Missouri.  Her parents were farmers. She holds a chemical engineering degree from the University of Missouri and a degree in international property law from UC Berkeley, where she also earned an MBA.

Lynn began her investment career at Morgenthaler Ventures in 2009. In 2012, she was made a partner.  In 2013, she co-founded Canvas Ventures, a VC firm spun out from Morganthaler.

In 2009, Lynn made an early stage investment in Lending Club (NYSE: LC).  She was appointed to the company's board of directors three months later.  In December 2014 Lending Club went public.  It was the largest U.S.tech IPO of the year, with the stock trading up 56% in its first day.

In addition to recognition in the Wall Street Journal  and the New York Times, Lynn was ranked on the Midas List five years in a row.   As of 2022 she was the top female investor in the history of the Midas List, which was first published by Forbes in 2001.

References

Venture capitalists
University of California, Berkeley alumni
University of Missouri alumni
Living people
Year of birth missing (living people)